Reference News is a Chinese newspaper. Founded in 1931, it is ranked 7th in the world by circulation and 1st in China.

Reference News was first published on 7 November 1931. The early editions of the newspaper were published under different titles in Ruijin until it was renamed Reference News in 1942. It is published by Xinhua News Agency (formerly Red China News Agency, 1931–1937). As the Chinese government's official news agency, Xinhua translates and re-publishes articles by foreign news agencies. Before the 1980s, it was the only official channel for the Chinese public to have a glimpse of the outside world. The paper is also published in the Uyghur, Kazakh, Korean, and Mongolian languages for ethnic minority groups in China.

Reference News was at first available only to cadres and their families, but it was made available to the entire Chinese public in the face of increasing competition, and subsequently its circulation dropped from 11 million in 1980 to 4 million in 1985.

References

External links 
  (Simplified Chinese)

1931 establishments in China
Chinese-language newspapers (Simplified Chinese)
Newspapers published in Beijing
Daily newspapers published in China
Publications established in 1931
Xinhua News Agency
Chinese Communist Party newspapers